Doe or Die: 15th Anniversary is the 15th anniversary edition of rapper AZ's debut album, Doe or Die, which was released in 1995 and received critical acclaim from music outlets. The album was released on November 30, 2010.

Overview
Doe or Die 15th: Anniversary features production from Frank Dukes, Statik Selektah, Lil' Fame, MoSS, Baby Paul, Nascent, QB, Roctimus Prime and Riggs Morales. The album also features vocals from R&B singer June Summers. All the songs from the original Doe or Die are remixed with a new beat.

Singles
The only single from the album is "Feel My Pain" and it was released on iTunes on June 29, 2010. A music video for "Feel My Pain" was released on June 7, 2010. A second music video for "Gimme Your's 2010" was released on November 29, 2010. The third music video for "The Calm" was released on February 3, 2011.

Track listing

References

AZ (rapper) albums
Albums produced by Frank Dukes
Albums produced by Statik Selektah
2010 albums